CATM may refer to:

 Canadian Army Training Memorandum, a military bulletin
 Captive Air Training Missile, an inert air-to-air/ground dummy missile
 Center for Air Toxic Metals, a Center of Excellence of the Energy and Environmental Research Center
 Combat Arms Training and Maintenance, a United States Air Force military training organization